Asian Science Camp 2022 (ASC 2022) was held from July 24 to July 30, 2022, and organized by the Institute for Basic Science and sponsored by the Ministry of Science and ICT, Daejeon Metropolitan City and Daejeon Tourism Organization. The 14th Asian Science Camp was held in a hybrid offline and online meeting due to travel complications during the COVID-19 pandemic. There was an expected 300 participants from 30 countries in Asia and turnout was around 250 students from 25 countries. The primary venue was the Science Culture Center at the Institute for Basic Science.

Lectures

Around 20 researchers participated in lectures and panel discussions. Video lectures were given by Nobel Prize laureates Stefan Hell, Tim Hunt and Randy Schekman followed by a Q&A session for each speaker. Others speakers include Axel Timmermann, Kevin Insik Hahn, Kim Young-Kee, Taeghwan Hyeon, Kim Eunjoon, Oh Yong-Geun, Changjoon Justin Lee, V. Narry Kim, and Sergej Flach. A panel discussion on dark matter was led by Yannis Semertzidis with Woohyun Chung and SungWoo Youn as panelists. A virus panel was chaired by Choi Young Ki with Eui-Cheol Shin, Hee-Chang Jang and Woo-Joo Kim as members.

Other events
A poster session was held and participants took site visits to the Institute for Basic Science headquarters, RAON and the Electronics and Telecommunications Research Institute. An excursion took place in Gongju Hanok Village.

Participation 
Participation in ASC 2022 was through invitation only. The Organizing Committee sent an invitation to the contact person of each country/region to announce the science camp to high schools and universities. There was no registration fee, and the Organizing Committee provided the living and local expenses of participants associated with ASC 2022.

See also
 Asian Science Camp 2016
 Asian Science Camp 2012

References

Science events
Youth conferences
Youth science
2022 in science
Daejeon